The 1912 Penn Quakers football team was an American football team that represented the University of Pennsylvania in the 1912 college football season. In their fourth and final season under head coach Andy Smith, the Quakers compiled a 7–4 record and outscored opponents by a total of 191 to 106. Fullback Leroy Mercer was selected as a first-team All-American by Walter Camp.

Schedule

References

Penn
Penn Quakers football seasons
Penn Quakers football